Geoffrey Kirkness is a British stage, screen and television actor.

Life and career
He trained as an actor at the Central School of Speech and Drama, London.

Kirkness has appeared in the London West End, where he played the leading role Dick Dewy, in Under the Greenwood Tree 1978-79, directed by Patrick Garland at the Vaudeville Theatre.  He joined the Royal Shakespeare Company subsequently, for The Irish Play by Ron Hutchinson, appearing as Dwyer.

Kirkness was the TV presenter in Ali G Indahouse, with Sacha Baron Cohen, 2002. He played Vice Admiral Phillips in the drama series Dunkirk, for the BBC, 2004 and General Alanbrooke in Into the Storm 2009, with Brendan Gleeson, for HBO television. He played Colin opposite Toyah Willcox in the film The Power of Three, 2011. In 2012 he appeared in the second series of The Hour, as Lord Reeves. In The Crimson Field he played Captain Osberton.

In Amundsen (2019), Kirkness played (name in role Charles Bennet) Charles Peto Bennett (1856–1940), timber merchant and collector, whose Norwegian wife Kristine had an adulterous affair with Roald Amundsen.

References

British male film actors
British male stage actors
Living people
Alumni of the Royal Central School of Speech and Drama
Royal Shakespeare Company members
Year of birth missing (living people)